Albion College is a private liberal arts college in Albion, Michigan. The college was founded in 1835 and its undergraduate population was approximately 1,500 students as of Fall 2021.

They participate in NCAA Division III and the Michigan Intercollegiate Athletic Association (MIAA). The college's athletic teams are nicknamed the Britons, and their colors are purple and gold.

History

On March 23, 1835, Methodist settlers in Spring Arbor Township obtained a charter for a new seminary from the Michigan Territorial Legislature. Construction began in 1837 outside Spring Arbor but the Panic of 1837 ended the project. A petition to move the seminary to Albion was approved by the legislature in 1839.

Sixty acres (243,000 m2) of land were donated by Jesse Crowell to the renamed Wesleyan Seminary, and construction began in 1841. The first classes were held in 1843 in the local Methodist Church. In 1844, classes began in the newly constructed Central Building, rebuilt as the present Robinson Hall in 1907.

The Albion Female Collegiate Institute, founded in 1850, merged in 1857 under the name The Wesleyan Seminary and Female College at Albion; the merger was finalized in 1861, under the name Albion College. The legislature authorized the college to confer full four-year college degrees upon both men and women that same year.

A marker designating the college as a Michigan Historic Site was erected in 1960 by the Michigan Historical Commission. The inscription reads:

Methodists obtained a charter for Spring Arbor Seminary from the Territorial Council of Michigan in March, 1835. Later the institution was established in Albion on land donated by Jesse Crowell, a leading Albion pioneer and benefactor. In 1841 the cornerstone was laid for the first building, and in 1843, the institution opened as the Wesleyan Seminary. In 1861 the power to confer degrees was obtained and the school named Albion College. Support from the Methodist Church, a large endowment, and private sources have contributed to its growth as a strong liberal arts college.

Academics

Albion offers bachelor’s degrees in business, the humanities, fine arts, natural sciences, and social sciences. It provides study-abroad programs in Europe, Latin America, Israel, Africa, Asia, and Australia.  Albion is perhaps best known for its equestrian center and its biology and physical education programs. Its most popular first majors, by number of 2021 graduates, were:
Biology/Biological Sciences (43)
Economics (33)
Communication (28)
Exercise Science & Kinesiology (21)
Research and Experimental Psychology (20)
Accounting (18)
Political Science & Government (17)

The  Whitehouse Nature Center plays an important role in classroom instruction at Albion College and offers its facilities and services as an environmental education area to public schools and the community. The Whitehouse Nature Center features six miles of trails, 400 plant species, almost 170 bird species, 25 acres of oak-hickory and flood-plain forest, a tall-grass prairie and spring in the Adele D. Whitehouse Wildflower Garden, an arboretum of Michigan trees and shrubs, 34 acres of farmland and research projects, and an interpretative building with classrooms, observation room, porch, and restrooms.

A marker designating the college observatory as a Michigan Historic Site was erected in 1985 by the Bureau of History Michigan Department of State. The inscription reads:

The Albion College Astronomical Observatory was built in 1883-84 at the urging of Dr. Samuel Dickie, who later became president of the college. Dickie helped raise $10,000 to build and equip the facility. The observatory still harbors its original telescope, transit circle, sidereal clock and chronograph. The building has housed classrooms, a bookstore, faculty offices and the West Michigan Methodist Conference archives. In 1984, it was refurbished as the college Ethics Center.

Since 1990 Albion has produced one (1) Rhodes Scholar, three (3) Goldwater Scholars, four (4) Truman Scholars and seventeen (17) Fulbright Scholars.

Athletics
Albion College is a part of the MIAA Conference.  Albion has overall won 173 men’s MIAA titles (tied for 2nd overall), as well as 26 women’s MIAA titles (5th overall). Albion won the NCAA Division III football championship in 1994. The Esports team started in the 2021-2022 academic year led by Director Karlo De Los Angeles.

Demographics
As of 2021 Fall enrollment, the student body was 53% female and 47% male. 73% of students were Michigan residents, 26% from out-of-state, and 1% from foreign countries. Ninety-eight percent of students are enrolled full-time. The ethnic composition of the student body was as follows:
White (55%)
Black/African American (17%)
Hispanic/Latino (12%)
Race/Ethnicity Unknown (9%)
Two or more Races (3%)
Asian (2%)
Non-resident Alien (2%)

Prior to the 2010s the enrollment was heavily white and non-low income. The numbers of black and Hispanic students increased, along with those of first-time university students and lower income students, due to a drive to increase and diversify enrollment. Between 2013 and 2020, Albion more than doubled its minority enrollment from 18% to 41%, and 48% of the incoming class in 2020 identified as persons of color.

Tuition and Financial Aid
The total cost of attending Albion full time as of 2022 was $67,310.  Albion offers financial aid of some form to 100% of its students. The average financial aid package as of December 2022 was $53,714 per student.

Greek life

Fraternities
Albion College is home to six social fraternities:
Tau Kappa Epsilon
Delta Sigma Phi
Delta Tau Delta
Sigma Nu
Sigma Chi
Alpha Tau Omega

All six fraternities on campus are all members of the North American Interfraternity Conference and all comprise Albion College's InterFraternity Council (IFC). IFC governs and coordinates the activities of the fraternal chapters on campus. Approximately 46.6% of the male population on campus belongs to one of the six fraternities. Each of the fraternities leases a fraternity house from the college where the members of the fraternity are required to live. The song "Sweetheart of Sigma Chi" was written in 1911 by Byron D. Stokes (Albion, 1913) and F. Dudleigh Vernor (Albion, 1914), and first performed by Harry Clifford (Albion, 1911) while undergraduates at Albion College.

A marker designating the college as a Michigan Historic Site for the origin of "Sweetheart of Sigma Chi" was erected in 1960 by the Michigan Historical Commission. The inscription reads:

It was in the spring of 1911 that two freshmen at Albion College, Byron D. Stokes and F. Dudleigh Vernor, wrote the words and music for a song they called "The Sweetheart of Sigma Chi." The song made a hit with their fraternity brothers, and requests for copies came in from other chapters. Within a few years the melody and lyrics of "The Sweetheart of Sigma Chi" had become familiar to people around the world.

Sororities
There are six general purpose social sororities. Of those six, five are members of the National Panhellenic Conference:
Kappa Delta
Alpha Chi Omega
Alpha Xi Delta
Delta Gamma
Kappa Alpha Theta

One of the six is a member of the National Pan-Hellenic Council:
Alpha Kappa Alpha

The members of the six social sororities at Albion College do not live in their lodges, but rather hold meetings and other events there. All six of the sorority chapters are members of the Albion College Panhellenic Council, which governs and coordinates the activities of sorority chapters on campus. Approximately 42% of the female population on campus belongs to one of the six sororities.

Professional and honorary fraternities
Albion College is also home to fifteen honorary, professional, service, and special interest fraternities, including:
Alpha Lambda Delta
Alpha Phi Omega
Beta Beta Beta
Delta Sigma Pi
Sigma Xi
Theta Phi Alpha
Kappa Kappa Psi
Omicron Delta Kappa
The Order of Omega
Phi Beta Kappa established as the Michigan Beta chapter in 1940, the second chapter in Michigan, following the University of Michigan's Alpha chapter. 
Phi Mu Alpha Sinfonia
Pi Sigma Alpha
Psi Chi
Sigma Alpha Iota
Sigma Gamma Epsilon

Notable alumni and faculty

References

External links

 
 Official athletics website

 
Education in Calhoun County, Michigan
Liberal arts colleges in Michigan
Educational institutions established in 1835
Buildings and structures in Calhoun County, Michigan
Tourist attractions in Calhoun County, Michigan
1835 establishments in Michigan Territory
Universities and colleges affiliated with the Methodist Episcopal Church
Private universities and colleges in Michigan
Universities and colleges accredited by the Higher Learning Commission